Győző Veres (13 June 1936 – 1 February 2011) was a Hungarian weightlifter. He was born in Berekböszörmény in Hajdú-Bihar County. He was Olympic bronze medalist in weightlifting in 1960 and 1964. He was named Hungarian Sportsman of the Year in 1963.

References

1936 births
2011 deaths
Sportspeople from Hajdú-Bihar County
Hungarian male weightlifters
Olympic weightlifters of Hungary
Weightlifters at the 1960 Summer Olympics
Weightlifters at the 1964 Summer Olympics
Weightlifters at the 1968 Summer Olympics
Olympic bronze medalists for Hungary
Olympic medalists in weightlifting
Medalists at the 1964 Summer Olympics
Medalists at the 1960 Summer Olympics